WSMG (1450 AM, "Jewel 95.5") is a radio station broadcasting an oldies music format. Licensed to Greeneville, Tennessee, United States, the station is currently owned by Radio Greeneville and features programming from Citadel Media and ESPN Radio.

From 2003 to 2017 WSMG was branded as "Oldies 1450".

Jewel 95.5 
On July 25, 2018, WSMG re-branded as "Jewel 95.5" named after the former Greeneville, Tennessee nickname "Jewel of the Mountains". The first song played was R.O.C.K. In The USA by John Cougar Mellencamp Syndicated programming includes "America's Greatest Hits" with Scott Shannon, Retromix with Christian Wheel, both versions of American Top 40 with Casey Kasem, Absolutely 80's with Nina Blackwood, and Acoustic Storm with Audrey Parets.

References

External links

SMG
Oldies radio stations in the United States